Endoreduplication (also referred to as endoreplication or endocycling) is replication of the nuclear genome in the absence of mitosis, which leads to elevated nuclear gene content and polyploidy. Endoreplication can be understood simply as a variant form of the mitotic cell cycle (G1-S-G2-M) in which mitosis is circumvented entirely, due to modulation of cyclin-dependent kinase (CDK) activity.  Examples of endoreplication characterized in arthropod, mammalian, and plant species suggest that it is a universal developmental mechanism responsible for the differentiation and morphogenesis of cell types that fulfill an array of biological functions. While endoreplication is often limited to specific cell types in animals, it is considerably more widespread in plants, such that polyploidy can be detected in the majority of plant tissues.

Examples in nature
Endoreplicating cell types that have been studied extensively in model organisms

Endoreplication, endomitosis and polytenization
Endoreplication, endomitosis and polytenization are three somewhat different processes resulting in polyploidization of a cell in a regulated manner. In endoreplication cells skip M phase completely, resulting in a mononucleated polyploid cell. Endomitosis is a type of cell cycle variation where mitosis is initiated, but some of the processes are not completed. Depending on how far the cell progresses through mitosis, this will give rise to a mononucleated or binucleated polyploid cell. Polytenization arises with under- or overamplification of some genomic regions, creating polytene chromosomes.

Biological significance
Based on the wide array of cell types in which endoreplication occurs, a variety of hypotheses have been generated to explain the functional importance of this phenomenon.  Unfortunately, experimental evidence to support these conclusions is somewhat limited:

Cell/organism size
Cell ploidy often correlates with cell size,  and in some instances, disruption of endoreplication results in diminished cell and tissue size  suggesting that endoreplication may serve as a mechanism for tissue growth.  Relative to mitosis, endoreplication does not require cytoskeletal rearrangement or the production of new cell membrane and it often occurs in cells that have already differentiated.  As such it may represent an energetically efficient alternative to cell proliferation among differentiated cell types that can no longer afford to undergo mitosis.  While evidence establishing a connection between ploidy and tissue size is prevalent in the literature, contrary examples also exist.

Cell differentiation
In developing plant tissues the transition from mitosis to endoreplication often coincides with cell differentiation and morphogenesis.  However it remains to be determined whether endoreplication and polyploidy contribute to cell differentiation or vice versa.  Targeted inhibition of endoreplication in trichome progenitors results in the production of multicellular trichomes that exhibit relatively normal morphology, but ultimately dedifferentiate and undergo absorption into the leaf epidermis.  This result suggests that endoreplication and polyploidy may be required for the maintenance of cell identity.

Oogenesis and embryonic development
Endoreplication is commonly observed in cells responsible for the nourishment and protection of oocytes and embryos.  It has been suggested that increased gene copy number might allow for the mass production of proteins required to meet the metabolic demands of embryogenesis and early development.  Consistent with this notion, mutation of the Myc oncogene in Drosophila follicle cells results in reduced endoreplication and abortive oogenesis.  However, reduction of endoreplication in maize endosperm has limited effect on the accumulation of starch and storage proteins, suggesting that the nutritional requirements of the developing embryo may involve the nucleotides that comprise the polyploid genome rather than the proteins it encodes.

Buffering the genome
Another hypothesis is that endoreplication buffers against DNA damage and mutation because it provides extra copies of important genes. However, this notion is purely speculative and there is limited evidence to the contrary.  For example, analysis of polyploid yeast strains suggests that they are more sensitive to radiation than diploid strains.

Stress response
Research in plants suggests that endoreplication may also play a role in modulating stress responses. By manipulating expression of E2fe (a repressor of endocycling in plants), researchers were able to demonstrate that increased cell ploidy lessens the negative impact of drought stress on leaf size.  Given that the sessile lifestyle of plants necessitates a capacity to adapt to environmental conditions, it is appealing to speculate that widespread polyploidization contributes to their developmental plasticity

Genetic control of endoreplication
The best-studied example of a mitosis-to-endocycle transition occurs in Drosophila follicle cells and is activated by Notch signaling.  Entry into endocycles involves modulation of mitotic and S-phase cyclin-dependent kinase (CDK) activity. Inhibition of M-phase CDK activity is accomplished via transcriptional activation of Cdh/fzr and repression of the G2-M regulator string/cdc25.  Cdh/fzr is responsible for activation of the anaphase-promoting complex (APC) and subsequent proteolysis of the mitotic cyclins.  String/cdc25 is a phosphatase that stimulates mitotic cyclin-CDK complex activity.  Upregulation of S-phase CDK activity is accomplished via transcriptional repression of the inhibitory kinase dacapo.  Together, these changes allow for the circumvention of mitotic entry, progression through G1, and entry into S-phase.  The induction of endomitosis in mammalian megakaryocytes involves activation of the c-mpl receptor by the thrombopoietin (TPO) cytokine and is mediated by ERK1/2 signaling. As with Drosophila follicle cells, endoreplication in megakaryocytes results from activation of S-phase cyclin-CDK complexes and inhibition of mitotic cyclin-CDK activity.

Entry into S-phase during endoreplication (and mitosis) is regulated through the formation of a prereplicative complex (pre-RC) at replication origins, followed by recruitment and activation of the DNA replication machinery.  In the context of endoreplication these events are facilitated by an oscillation in cyclin E-Cdk2 activity.  Cyclin E-Cdk2 activity drives the recruitment and activation of the replication machinery, but it also inhibits pre-RC formation, presumably to ensure that only one round of replication occurs per cycle.  Failure to maintain control over pre-RC formation at replication origins results in a phenomenon known as “rereplication” which is common in cancer cells.  The mechanism by which cyclin E-Cdk2 inhibits pre-RC formation involves downregulation of APC-Cdh1-mediated proteolysis and accumulation of the protein Geminin, which is responsible for sequestration of the pre-RC component Cdt1.

Oscillations in Cyclin E-Cdk2 activity are modulated via transcriptional and post-transcriptional mechanisms.  Expression of cyclin E is activated by E2F transcription factors that were shown to be required for endoreplication.  Recent work suggests that observed oscillations in E2F and cyclin E protein levels result from a negative-feedback loop involving Cul4-dependent ubiquitination and degradation of E2F.  Post-transcriptional regulation of cyclin E-Cdk2 activity involves Ago/Fbw7-mediated proteolytic degradation of cyclin E  and direct inhibition by factors such as Dacapo and p57. True endomitosis in the anther tapetum of the liliaceous plant Eremurus is described. The nuclear membrane does not disappear, but during metaphase the chromosomes are condensed, often considerably more than in normal mitosis. When the pollen mother cells (PMCs) go through the last premeiotic mitosis, the tapetal cells have one diploid nucleus which divides while the cell remains undivided. The two diploid nuclei may undergo an endomitosis and the resulting tetraploid nuclei a second endomitosis. An alternative pathway is an ordinary mitosis-again without cell division instead of one of the endomitotic cycles. The cytological picture in the tapetum is further complicated by restitution in anaphase and fusion of metaphase and anaphase groups during mitosis, processes which could give rise to cells with one, two, or three nuclei, instead of the expected two or four. No sign of the so-called "inhibited" mitosis is seen in these tapetal cells. When the PMCs are in leptotene-zygotene, very few tapetal nuclei are in endomitosis. When the PMCs have reached diplotene, almost 100% of cells which are not in interphase show an endomitotic stage.

Endoreplication and oncogenesis
Polyploidy and aneuploidy are common phenomena in cancer cells.  Given that oncogenesis and endoreplication likely involve subversion of common cell cycle regulatory mechanisms, a thorough understanding of endoreplication may provide important insights for cancer biology.

Premeiotic endomitosis in unisexual vertebrates

The unisexual salamanders (genus Ambystoma) are the oldest known unisexual vertebrate lineage, having arisen about 5 million years ago.  In these polyploid unisexual females, an extra premeiotic endomitotic replication of the genome, doubles the number of chromosomes.  As a result, the mature eggs that are produced subsequent to the two meiotic divisions have the same ploidy as the somatic cells of the adult female salamander.  Synapsis and recombination during meiotic prophase I in these unisexual females is thought to ordinarily occur between identical sister chromosomes and occasionally between homologous chromosomes.  Thus little, if any, genetic variation is produced.  Recombination between homeologous chromosomes occurs rarely, if at all.  Since production of genetic variation is weak, at best, it is unlikely to provide a benefit sufficient to account for the maintenance of meiosis for millions of years.  Perhaps the efficient recombinational repair of DNA damages at each generation provided by meiosis has been a sufficient advantage to maintain meiosis.

References

Genetics
Cell biology
Cell cycle